Ashta Assembly constituency is one of the 230 Vidhan Sabha (Legislative Assembly) constituencies of Madhya Pradesh state in central India.

It is part of Sehore District, Lok Sabha constituencies Dewas (Lok Sabha constituency).

Member of Legislative Assembly

See also
 Ashta, Madhya Pradesh

References

Assembly constituencies of Madhya Pradesh